Frederick William Gowing OBE (1918–2001) was Archdeacon of Armagh from 1979 to 1984.

Gowing was educated at Trinity College, Dublin and the Church of Ireland Theological College. He was ordained in 1942. After a curacy in Portadown he was the incumbent of Woodschapel, and then Mullavilly.

References

1918 births
Alumni of the Church of Ireland Theological Institute
Alumni of Trinity College Dublin
Deans of Armagh
20th-century Irish Anglican priests
2001 deaths
Officers of the Order of the British Empire